Stephen Richard Prothero (born November 13, 1960) is an American scholar of religion. He is the C. Allyn and Elizabeth V. Russell Professor of Religion in America at Boston University and the author or editor of eleven books on religion in the United States, including the New York Times bestseller Religious Literacy.

He has commented on religion on dozens of National Public Radio programs and on television on CNN, NBC, CBS, Fox, PBS, MSNBC, The Oprah Winfrey Show, The Daily Show with Jon Stewart, and The Colbert Report.  He was the chief editorial consultant for the six-hour WGBH television series God in America and he has served as a consultant on American religious history at the Smithsonian's National Museum of American History. A regular contributor to USA Today, he has also written for The New York Times Magazine, The New York Times Book Review, Slate, Salon, The Washington Post, the Los Angeles Times, The Boston Globe, and The Wall Street Journal.

Prothero has argued for mandatory public-school biblical literacy courses (along the lines of the Bible Literacy Project's The Bible and Its Influence), along with mandatory courses on world religions. He delivered the William Belden Noble Lectures at Harvard University on November 18–20 on the topic: “The Work of Doing Nothing: Wandering as Practice and Play." On the matter of his own personal beliefs, Prothero describes himself as "religiously confused".

Books
 God the Bestseller: How One Editor Transformed American Religion a Book at a Time (2023)
 Religion Matters: An Introduction to the World's Religions (2020)
 Why Liberals Win The Culture Wars (Even When They Lose Elections) (2016)
 The American Bible: How Our Words Unite, Divide, and Define a Nation (2012)
 God Is Not One: The Eight Rival Religions That Run the World—and Why Their Differences Matter (2010)
 Religious Literacy: What Every American Needs to Know—and Doesn't (2007)
 A Nation of Religions:  The Politics of Pluralism in Multireligious America (2006)
 American Jesus: How the Son of God Became a National Icon (2003)
 Purified by Fire: A History of Cremation in America (2001)
 Asian Religions in America: A Documentary History, co-edited with Thomas A. Tweed (1998)
 The White Buddhist: The Asian Odyssey of Henry Steel Olcott (1996)

References

External links 

American religion academics
21st-century American historians
21st-century American male writers
American religious writers
Boston University faculty
Living people
Harvard University alumni
Yale University alumni
1960 births
American male non-fiction writers